Luke Morahan (born 13 April 1990) is an Australian rugby player currently playing for the Bristol Bears in the English Premiership since 2017. Morahan's main position is on the wing, however, he does also play fullback.

Career
Morahan represented the Queensland U-16, Qld Schools and Australia A Schools before entering the Premier Colts (U19) ranks in 2008. He was also one of the top try scorers in the premier competition with 10 tries. He has also represented Australia internationally in the IRB Sevens World Series circuit. He made his 7's debut in the 2008 South Africa Sevens where he was the equal top try scorer with seven tries. He notched up four tries in the Wellington leg and his impressive appearance continued when he notched a further six tries in San Diego, before joining the Reds academy. He got called up for the Reds, making his debut against the Lions in the Super 14 competition before a shoulder injury ruled him out of the season, however Wallaby coach Robbie Deans was sufficiently impressed with the youngster's performances and after a calf injury ruled out Wallaby centre, Stirling Mortlock, Morahan was called up to join the Wallabies on their 2009 Autumn Internationals.

He joined the Australian sevens team for the 2010 Commonwealth Games where his team won the silver medal. He got another call-up from the Wallabies as he was included in their squad for the 2010 Autumn Internationals.
Morahan was called up to the Wallabies squad to play the British & Irish Lions following his try against the Lions with the Queensland Reds.

On 20 March 2017, Morahan left Australia to travel to England to sign for Bristol Rugby ahead of the 2017–18 season. At the end of the 2017–18 season, Morahan helped his new club to win the RFU Championship title and promotion to the Premiership. He also finished as the top try scorer in the league that season with 17 tries.

Super Rugby statistics

Honours

Bristol
European Rugby Challenge Cup: 2019–20
RFU Championship: 2017–18
RFU Championship top try scorer: 2017–18 (17 tries)

References

External links
 Reds profile
 Wallabies profile

1990 births
Australian rugby union players
Australia international rugby union players
Australian expatriate sportspeople in England
Queensland Reds players
Western Force players
Bristol Bears players
Male rugby sevens players
Rugby union wings
Rugby union fullbacks
Living people
Rugby union players from Brisbane
Perth Spirit players
Australia international rugby sevens players
Commonwealth Games silver medallists for Australia
Rugby sevens players at the 2010 Commonwealth Games
Commonwealth Games medallists in rugby sevens
Commonwealth Games rugby sevens players of Australia
Medallists at the 2010 Commonwealth Games